The 2024 United States Senate election in Virginia will be held on November 5, 2024, to elect a member of the United States Senate to represent the state of Virginia. Incumbent two-term Democratic Senator Tim Kaine was elected in 2018 with 57% of the vote.

Democratic primary

Candidates

Declared
 Tim Kaine, incumbent U.S. Senator (2013–present)

Republican primary

Candidates

Declared
Jonathan Emord, author and constitutional litigator

Filed paperwork

Publicly expressed interest
Scott Parkinson, Club for Growth vice president of government affairs

Potential
 Tim Anderson, retiring member of the Virginia House of Delegates from the 83rd district (2022–2024). 
 Glenn Youngkin, Governor of Virginia (2022–present)

Endorsements

General election

Predictions

Polling

Tim Kaine vs. Glenn Youngkin

Notes

References

External links
Official campaign websites
 Jonathan Emord (R) for Senate
 Tim Kaine (D) for Senate

2024
Virginia
United States Senate